The island of Saint Helena has been influenced by several European powers, by the inhabitants, (especially  enslaved people) and the ships passing through, during its history. This has affected the cuisine of Saint Helena, which now has a vibrant and international cuisine variety.

Popular dishes
Popular dishes on the island include traditional British Sunday roast, curry and rice, black pudding, pumpkin stew, spicy fishcakes and Plo. Fish is one of the staple foods, along with rice, and spices are added to make a wide variety of dishes similar to those found in the Caribbean.

Fishcakes are made from a mixture of spices, herbs, mashed potato and fresh fish like tuna and are shallow-fried until golden brown. Plo is a versatile one-pot dish made by combining a spiced curried rice with meat or fish; it can also be made without curry and just vegetables (known locally as "white Plo").  Coconut fingers are long, finger-shaped Madeira cakes dipped in pink icing and rolled in coconut. Pumpkin pudding is a dish of baked pumpkin, dried fruit, flour, eggs and nutmeg. Pumpkin pudding and coconut fingers are popular desserts.

Ingredients
Most ingredients for the most popular dishes are found locally. Fish such as tuna, wahoo and mackerel are used, and often mixed with a variety of herbs and spices. Curries are made from meat or fish, and are served piping hot with a large amount of spice and often no vegetables at all. Fruit and vegetables are mostly locally grown, such as pumpkin, yams and banana.

Local drinks
Saint Helena is famous for its coffee and the island also produces a special distilled drink called Tungi Spirit.

References

External links
 See a selection of St. Helena recipes.
 Celebrating St Helena cuisine with recipes and stories.

 
Saint Helenian culture
Saint Helena